The 52nd General Assembly of Prince Edward Island was in session from June 2, 1970, to April 3, 1974. The Liberal Party led by Alex Campbell formed the government.

Cecil A. Miller was elected speaker.

There were five sessions of the 52nd General Assembly:

Members

Kings

Prince

Queens

Notes:

References
 Election results for the Prince Edward Island Legislative Assembly, 1970-05-11
 O'Handley, Kathryn Canadian Parliamentary Guide, 1994 

Terms of the General Assembly of Prince Edward Island
1970 establishments in Prince Edward Island
1974 disestablishments in Prince Edward Island